The median antebrachial vein is a superficial vein of the (anterior) forearm. It arises from - and drains - the superficial palmar venous arch, ascending superficially along the anterior forearm before terminating by draining into either the basilic vein and/or median cubital vein (it may bifurcate distal to the elbow and proceed to drain into both aforementioned veins).

References 

Veins of the upper limb